David Gunn is an American composer most notedly known for founding Kalvos & Damian New Music Bazaar.  His performances on the Kalvos and Damian show are indictive to his unorthodox and quirky composition aesthetic which he is known for. Gunn was also selected for the 60x60 project in 2005 and 2006.

Discography
60x60 (2004-2005)  Vox Novus VN-001
60x60 (2003) Capstone Records CPS-8744
Somewhere East of Topeka Albany Records TROY535

References

External links
 David Gunn's homepage

Living people
American male composers
21st-century American composers
21st-century American male musicians
Year of birth missing (living people)